No. 657 Squadron RAF was a unit of the Royal Air Force in North Africa, Italy and the Netherlands  during the Second World War and afterwards in Germany. 
Numbers 651 to 663 Squadrons of the RAF were Air Observation Post units working closely with British Army units in artillery spotting and liaison. Their duties and squadron numbers were transferred to the Army with the formation of the Army Air Corps on 1 September 1957.

History
No. 657 Squadron was formed at RAF Ouston on 31 January 1943. It went into action in August of that year, in North Africa. It later served in Italy, the Netherlands and Germany. In November 1945, the squadron returned to the UK and continued to support army units in the South of England until disbanded by being renumbered No. 651 Squadron RAF on 1 November 1955.

No. 1900 Independent Air Observation Post Flight was formed within 657 Squadron previously 'A' & 'B' Flights along with No. 1901 Air Observation Post Flight which was formed within 657 previously 'C' Flight.

The original squadron's heritage is being taken forward today by No. 657 Squadron AAC of the Joint Special Forces Aviation Wing.

Aircraft operated

Squadron bases

See also
List of Royal Air Force aircraft squadrons

References

Notes

Bibliography

External links
 History of No.'s 651–670 Squadrons at RAF Web
 657 Squadron Army Air Corps at Elite UK Forces

657 Squadron
Aircraft squadrons of the Royal Air Force in World War II
Military units and formations established in 1943